Gamesa (formerly Galletera Mexicana S.A. de C.V. "Mexican Biscuit Company") is Mexico's largest manufacturer of cookies. The company also makes flour, ready to eat cereals and other related products. It is headquartered in San Nicolás de los Garza, Nuevo León, Mexico, and have production facilities in eight states across Mexico and one in Colombia. In 1990, they were acquired by PepsiCo, also owner of Pepsi, Sabritas and Sonric's in Mexico.

Gamesa also sells cookies in the United States, Central and South America and the Caribbean.

Among their most successful brands are "Marias Gamesa", "Emperador", "Arcoiris", "Mamut", "Chokis", "Cremax", "Marca Gamesa", "Saladitas", "Crackets", among others.

History 
Alberto, Ignacio, and Manuel Santos Gonzalez, three brothers, acquired the majority of the stocks of the pasta and cookie company "Lara" in 1921, which would change name and merge with other companies to create "Gamesa".

References

External links 
 Company website

Monterrey metropolitan area
Manufacturing companies of Mexico
Mexican brands
PepsiCo subsidiaries
Food and drink companies established in 1921
Mexican companies established in 1921